Mariane Petersen (born 1937) is a Greenlandic poet, translator, museum curator, and politician.

Biography 
Petersen was born in Maniitsoq, a town in western Greenland that was then known as Sukkertoppen. She is trained as a translator and has translated various books from Danish into Greenlandic. Significant works of translation include Vinterbørn by Dea Trier Mørch and Århundradets kärlekssaga by Märta Tikkanen.

She also worked for many years as a curator at the Greenland National Museum, serving as director from 1982 until her retirement in 2004.

In 1988 she published her first volume of poetry, Niviugaq aalakoortoq allallu. It was the first poetry collection published by a woman in Greenlandic. For this work, she was nominated for the Nordic Council Literature Prize in 1993. That year she published Inuiaat nunaallu, an epic poem bout the history of Greenland, followed by the collection Asuliivik asuli in 1997. In 2012, she was honored with the Frederik Nielsen Memorial Fund's 10,000-kroner prize.

Her latest work, Piniartorsuit kinguaavi, was also nominated for the Nordic Council prize in 2013, though she lost to the Danish-Norwegian author Kim Leine.

Petersen's poetry is generally humorous in tone and often deals with everyday life in Greenland. She writes in both Greenlandic and Danish, translating her own work.

She is also a politician, having previously sat on the Nuuk Municipal Council.

Selected works

Poetry 

 1988: Niviugaq aalakoortoq allallu
 1993: Inuiaat nunaallu
 1997: Asuliivik asuli
 2010: Piniartorsuit kinguaavi taallat/Storfangernes efterkommere

Translations 

 1977: Svend Otto S.: Tim og Trine, translated as Tim aamma Trine
 1978: Dea Trier Mørch: Vinterbørn, translated as Íssip nalâne inúngortut
 1980: Mogens Hoff: Børnene ved Krokodillesøen, translated as Meeqqat kuukkooriarsuit tasiata sinaamiut
 1981: Barbro Sedwall: Fiskarbarn, translated as Aalisartukkut paniat
 1981: Ole Hertz: Tobias pa sælfangst, translated as Tuppiarsi puisinniartoq
 1981: Ole Hertz: Tobias fisker fra isen, translated as Tuppiarsi sikumi aalisartoq
 1986: Aage Gilberg: Verdens nordligste læge, translated as Avanersuarmi nakorsaq
 1988: Glen Rounds: The Blind Colt, translated as Hesti piaraq tappiitsoq
 1989: Märta Tikkanen: Århundradets kärlekssaga, translated as Asanninneq naliitsoq
 1989: Mette Newth: Bortførelsen, translated as Aallarussineq
 1992: Ole Lund Kirkegaard: Mig og Bedstefar – og så Nisse Pok, translated as Uangalu aatagalu aammalu Nissi Pooq
 1993: Kenneth Thomasma: Naya Nuki, translated as Naya Nuki – niviarsiaraq qimaasoq
 1994: Torbjørn Borgen: Svampe i Grønland, translated as Pupiit Kalaallit Nunaanni
 1996: Jørgen F. Nissen: Erfaring, styrke – og håb, translated as Misilittagaqarneq, sapiissuseqalerneq, aamma neriunneq
 1996: Maaliaaraq Vebæk: Navaranaaq og andre, translated as Navaranaaq allallu
 1997: Jørgen F. Nissen: Uliv, translated as Inuunipalaaq
 2003: Ole Hertz: Tobias fisker ørred, translated as Tuppiarsi eqalunniartoq
 2006: Hans-Christian Gulløv: Grønlands forhistorie, translated as Kalaallit Nunaata itsarsuaq oqaluttuassartaa
 2016: Gunvor Bjerre: Månemanden og andre fortællinger fra Grønland, translated as Qaammatip inua oqaluttuallu allat Kalaallit Nunaanneersut

References 

1937 births
Greenlandic women writers
Greenlandic translators
Greenlandic city councillors
Greenlandic women poets
Greenlandic women curators
Living people